The 2014–15 season was the 58th season in RK Zamet’s history. It is their 7th successive season in the Dukat Premier League, and 37th successive top tier season.

First team squad

Goalkeeper
 1  Marin Đurica
 12  Korado Juričić
 16  Dino Slavić

Wingers
RW
 3  Sandro Samardžić
 6  Dario Černeka
 11  Filip Glavaš
LW
 2  Damir Vučko
 9  Viktor Stipčić

Line players
 7  Milan Uzelac (captain)
 10  Marko Jerčinović
 23  Filip Briški

Back players
LB
 8  Bojan Lončarić
 15  Petar Jelušić
 18  Lovro Jotić
CB
 5  Luka Mrakovčić
 14  Matija Golik
 17  Raul Valković

RB
 22  Marko Mrakovičić
 13  Luka Kovačević

Technical staff
  President: Vedran Devčić
  Sports director: Vedran Babić
  Head Coach: Marin Mišković
  Assistant Coach: Valter Matošević
  Goalkeeper Coach: Valter Matošević
  Fitness Coach: Dragan Marijanović
  Tehniko: Williams Černeka

Competitions

Overall

Matches

Dukat Premier League

Matches

Play-offs

Matches

Croatian Cup

PGŽ Cup - Qualifier matches

Matches

Pre-season tournaments

Memorial Robert Barbić - Beli

Friendly matches

Appearances and goals

Source: League Squad

Goalkeepers

Source: League Squad

Transfers

In

Out

External links
Official website of RK Zamet (Croatian)
European record  (English)

References

RK Zamet seasons